The Brisbane Rugby League was a rugby league football competition in Brisbane, Queensland, Australia. It was first held in 1922 and for every year until 1997. The competition was reinstated in 2001, known as the FOGS premiership under the Queensland Cup. The competition consists of Brisbane's top six rugby league clubs. Each participating team is a feeder club for the Queensland Cup.

Prior to 1922, the competition was conducted under the auspices of the Queensland Rugby League. Until the 1980s it was the premier sporting competition in Brisbane, attracting large crowds and broad media coverage. The Brisbane Rugby League however, had been in slow decline for some 15 years as large numbers of its players left to compete in the more lucrative Sydney Rugby League, and began to lose popular interest with the creation of the Brisbane Broncos in 1988. Also in 1988, the Sydney Rugby League de facto superseded the Brisbane Rugby League by going national and including the Broncos and Giants clubs. However, the BRL maintained legal top-flight status until the advent of the national Australian Rugby League premiership in 1995, which superseded both it and the Sydney Rugby League premiership. The Brisbane Rugby League premiership then became a second-tier competition until it ceased and was fully replaced at this level by the Queensland Cup before the 1998 season. The FOGS Cup, a third-tier competition under the NRL and Queensland Cup, changed its name to the Brisbane Rugby League in 2016.

History

Predecessor: QRFL
The Queensland Rugby Football League (QRFL) was formed in 1908 by seven former rugby union players who were dissatisfied with the administration of the Queensland Rugby Union (QRU). The new organisation was attacked by both the local press and the QRU for introducing professionalism, which they claimed would destroy the sport. The "founding fathers" of the QRFL included John Fihelly, an Australian Labor Party Member of Parliament who became Minister for Railways and Deputy Premier.

The first official club competition kicked off in Brisbane on 8 May 1909. Norths played against Souths before a handful of spectators at Brisbane Cricket Ground. Matches were played under the auspices of the Queensland Amateur Rugby Football League (later renamed Queensland Rugby League). The foundation clubs were:

 North Brisbane
 Fortitude Valley
 South Brisbane
 Toombul

Note: Queensland Rugby League era statistics are not counted as Brisbane Rugby League statistics.

Schism: establishment of the Brisbane Rugby League
In 1922 the Brisbane Rugby Football League (Brisbane Rugby Football League, later Brisbane Rugby League) was formed out of dissatisfaction with the way the Queensland Rugby League ran the game. Those involved took particular exception to the salary being earned by Harry Sunderland as secretary of the Queensland Rugby League. The Brisbane Rugby League took control of the local competition. Competing in the Brisbane Rugby League competition that year were Brothers, Carltons, Coorparoo, University, Valley and Wests, with Past Grammars rejoining in 1924. Although the Queensland Rugby League attempted to regain control of the Brisbane Rugby League competition in 1923 and 1924, the Brisbane Rugby League remained steadfast and the dispute simmered into the next decade. so dire did the situation become, that by the late 1920s, the Queensland Rugby League commenced its own competition involving Ipswich clubs and two supporting Brisbane clubs.

Until 1932 Brisbane Exhibition Ground was the home of rugby league in the city. The complicated arrangement between the Brisbane Rugby League, Queensland Rugby League and Royal National Association (who administered the Exhibition Ground) led to Brisbane Cricket Ground being used for rugby league matches.

In 1933 district football was introduced to provide community support and player equalisation. This meant that players had to live within a certain distance of their club. Accordingly, Brisbane was divided into Eastern Suburbs (incorporating Coorparoo and Wynnum), Southern Suburbs (incorporating Carltons), Western Suburbs, Northern Suburbs (incorporating Past Grammars), Fortitude Valley and Past Brothers (whose players had to prove that they had attended a Christian Brothers school). In 1934, the University Amateur Rugby League Club folded and disappeared from the competition.

In 1953 the friction between the Queensland Rugby League and Brisbane Rugby League ended, with the Brisbane Rugby League being replaced by the Brisbane division of the Queensland Rugby League. Former Brisbane Rugby League chairman and Queensland Rugby League secretary Ron McAullife eventually secured the use of Lang Park as a permanent home for rugby league in Queensland. Teams that joined the Brisbane Rugby League competition around this time were South Coast (1952–1953), Wynnum-Manly (1951) and Redcliffe (1960).

A then-record crowd at Lang Park of 19,824 saw Northern Suburbs defeat Fortitude Valley in the Brisbane Rugby League grand final in September 1961.

Golden Years
In 1967 the Queensland Rugby League removed the residential qualifications for players in Brisbane Rugby League clubs, meaning that players did not have to reside in their certain suburbs to play for their teams. This reduced community support for teams, and club decisions began to be made on a more commercial basis.

This coincided with the commencement of television broadcasts of Brisbane Rugby League games in the same year. The money made from jersey sponsorships and advertising hoardings at grounds was not able to compete with poker machine money available to Sydney Rugby League clubs in the Sydney Rugby League, and an increasing number of players left the Brisbane Rugby League. This also affected the popularity of the Bulimba Cup which had been held between the cities of Brisbane, Ipswich and Toowoomba since the 1930s.

In 1978 the premiership trophy, the Kirks Cup was replaced by the Winfield Cup.

The Queensland Rugby League commissioned Eric White Associates to investigate the administrative structure of the game in Queensland in 1977. One of the recommendations was the creation of a statewide competition. The Winfield State League was created in 1982. The State League competition ran in parallel to the Brisbane Rugby League competition from 1982 to 1995. Also, like with Sydney's competition, Brisbane's competition was also called the Winfield Cup during the 1980s, due to sponsorship from Winfield cigarettes. The Queensland Cup would eventually replace both the State league and the Brisbane Rugby League premiership in 1996 and 1998.

In the 1980s, two further teams were added to the Brisbane Rugby League competition: Ipswich (1986) and Logan (1987).

Despite some New South Wales Rugby League (Sydney Rugby League) premiership games being re-broadcast during late night timeslots from the late 1970s, the Brisbane Rugby League remained the more popular competition in Queensland until 1988 with the weekly live broadcast of the Match of the Round being played at Lang Park.

Decline
In 1986 the New South Wales Rugby League decided to allow a team from Brisbane to enter the Sydney Rugby League premiership. While the New South Wales Rugby League was originally negotiating a Brisbane team sponsored by the Queensland Rugby League, a private bid in the form of the Brisbane Broncos was instead accepted by the New South Wales Rugby League. The Brisbane Broncos debuted in the Sydney Rugby League premiership in 1988.

As the Broncos began to represent Brisbane at rugby league in the public eye the Brisbane Rugby League competition entered the terminal phase of its decline. The dominance of the Brisbane Broncos in the media resulted in the Brisbane Rugby League losing live coverage of games and receiving only minor interest from the sports media. The drop in interest saw the Brisbane Rugby League, its clubs and its junior development base incurring significant and crippling financial losses. Several longstanding clubs were not able to survive the impact over the coming years.

From 1988, Brisbane Rugby League players weren't chosen to represent Queensland again. The Brisbane Rugby League premiership was fully superseded by the ARL Premiership which took nationwide first-class status in 1995. The BRL became a state competition from 1995-97 until the Queensland Cup, which became a league-style competition in 1998, superseded the BRL as the top state league. Redcliffe won the last Brisbane Rugby League Grand Final in 1997 defeating Easts 35–6, and the league was declared defunct.

Return of the Brisbane Rugby League Premiership

On 26 September 2014, the South East Queensland Division announced that they will be scrapping the existing FOGS Cup structure and reforming the Brisbane Rugby League as the state's secondary competition. Legally, although they share the same name, this competition is completely separate from the original BRL.

Brisbane Rugby League Club Teams

Representative team 

Selected players from the Brisbane Rugby League clubs, represented Brisbane in matches against various Sydney Rugby League clubs.The representative team for Brisbane was called Combined Brisbane, but was also called Brisbane Capitals or Brisbane Firsts or Brisbane Poinsettias.

Grand Final results

 * = Team undefeated
Although the Brisbane Rugby League took a significant financial and competitive downturn, it did not become a second-flight competition when the Brisbane Broncos entered the Sydney Rugby League in 1988. Rather, it officially lost top-tier status after the 1994 season, before the advent of the Australian Rugby League, in 1995.

Brisbane Rugby League Premiers (All Grades) (1922–1997)

 * = Team undefeated

Quotes
 "Well that is a tragedy, to be honest with you. There's no club identity at all now. If you don't follow the Broncos well who do you follow? That means you've got to follow a New South Wales side. I think I'm sure that's what McAuliffe didn't want to happen. But when they brought in the Queensland side into the NSWRL that was the end of the Brisbane Rugby League, as far as that was concerned. It should never have happened because as it turned out, if we did lose players from Queensland to go to New South Wales we had the State of Origin. We've been winning the State of Origin, and you can imagine if we were keeping our players, the club competition would be just as good as what it was when I was playing. But that is a tragedy as far as I'm concerned is that the people miss that club identity." -Barry Muir, in 2001, on the decline of the Brisbane Rugby League and the rise of the Sydney Rugby League.
 "Yeah well the crowd was great, they supported you wholeheartedly, they came along but it wasn't only down here on the football field it was on the streets up there. People would come up and talk to you, they'd stop you in the street and get your autograph and have a talk to you and wish you all the best and really support you in what you were doing and lifting the Club. There was four or five players here that were top-line footballers and we used to go up on the terrace and sell raffles in front of McCarthy's Jewellers store on the terrace and we'd do an hour there and then pop down to the Manly Hotel and do an hour there and then we'd pop down to Fishers (pub) and do an hour there. The players were prepared to do it because they were getting the support from this area and they would give it back on the playing field and however they could meet the people on the streets. I don't think anyone turned away from you, it was just one big happy family. We used to have like a barbecue after the game and there'd be 100 or 200 people that would turn up for the barbecue, we had it at various areas." -Lionel Morgan, in 2001, on the support of the Brisbane Rugby League in the Wynnum-Manly district.

See also

Queensland Cup
Winfield State League

References

External links

A History of Brisbane Rugby League (1909-2017)

1922 in rugby league
Rugby league competitions in Queensland
Rugby league in Brisbane
Queensland Rugby League